Fateh Singh may refer to:

 Maharana Fateh Singh of Udaipur and Mewar (1849–1930)
 Baba Fateh Singh, youngest son of Guru Gobind Singh
 Fateh Singh (cricketer) (born 2004)
 Fateh Singh (Sikh leader) (1911–1972), Sikh leader from India, revered as Sant Fateh Singh
 Fateh Singh Rao Gaekwar (1930–1988), Maharaja of Baroda, India
 Chaudhary Fateh Singh, Indian politician
 Fateh Singh (shooter) (fl. 1995–2016), Indian army officer and commonwealth medalist
 Fateh Bahadur Singh, Indian politician from Uttar Pradesh, India
 Bhai Fateh Singh Ji (fl. 1704–1716), Sikh warrior